The East Orange VA Medical Center is a United States Department of Veterans Affairs hospital complex located at 385 Tremont Avenue in East Orange of Essex County, New Jersey. Established in 1952, it is part of the VA New Jersey Health Care System. Listed as the East Orange VA Hospital, it was added to the National Register of Historic Places on September 4, 2018, for its significance in health/medicine.

History
After World War II, the Veterans Administration built new medical facilities near urban areas. In 1946, the VA selected this site, part of the estate of Louis Bamberger, who had built his wealth as owner of Bamberger's department store in Newark. Construction started in 1949, and the hospital opened in 1952.

Historic district
The East Orange VA Hospital is a  historic district encompassing the medical center campus. It was listed as part of the United States Third Generation Veterans Hospitals, 1946–1958, Multiple Property Submission (MPS). The district includes 9 contributing buildings. The buildings are clad in brick and feature elements of Art Deco.

See also
 National Register of Historic Places listings in Essex County, New Jersey
 List of Veterans Affairs medical facilities by state
 Lyons VA Medical Center – first VA hospital in New Jersey

References

External links

East Orange, New Jersey
Veterans Affairs medical facilities
1952 establishments in New Jersey
Hospital buildings completed in 1952
Buildings and structures in Essex County, New Jersey
Art Deco architecture in New Jersey
National Register of Historic Places in Essex County, New Jersey
Hospital buildings on the National Register of Historic Places in New Jersey
Historic districts on the National Register of Historic Places in New Jersey
New Jersey Register of Historic Places